Lim Pek Har is a Malaysian politician from DAP. She was the Member of Perak State Legislative Assembly for Menglembu from 2008 to 2018.

Politics 
In March 2018, before the 2018 Malaysian general election, she was dropped by her party and will not be able to defend her seat.

Election result

References 

Democratic Action Party (Malaysia) politicians
Members of the Perak State Legislative Assembly
Malaysian people of Chinese descent
Malaysian politicians of Chinese descent
Living people
Year of birth missing (living people)